Teerawat Kangtong (born 10 May 1994) is a Thai karateka. He won the gold medal in the men's kumite +75 kg event at the 2019 Southeast Asian Games held in Manila, Philippines. He also won the gold medal in the men's kumite 84 kg event at the 2013 Southeast Asian Games. He is a three-time bronze medalist at the Asian Karate Championships.

Career 

In 2015, he won one of the bronze medals in the men's kumite +84 kg event at the Asian Karate Championships held in Yokohama, Japan.

At the 2018 Asian Karate Championships held in Amman, Jordan, he won one of the bronze medals in the men's kumite +84 kg event. A month later, he competed in the men's kumite +84 kg event at the Asian Games held in Jakarta, Indonesia. He was eliminated in his first match by Daniyar Yuldashev of Kazakhstan.

The following year, at the 2019 Asian Karate Championships held in Tashkent, Uzbekistan, he also won one of the bronze medals in this event.

In 2021, he competed at the World Olympic Qualification Tournament held in Paris, France hoping to qualify for the 2020 Summer Olympics in Tokyo, Japan.

Achievements

References 

Living people
1994 births
Place of birth missing (living people)
Teerawat Kangtong
Karateka at the 2014 Asian Games
Karateka at the 2018 Asian Games
Teerawat Kangtong
Southeast Asian Games medalists in karate
Competitors at the 2013 Southeast Asian Games
Competitors at the 2019 Southeast Asian Games
Teerawat Kangtong
Teerawat Kangtong